The Imperial Order of Saint Prince Vladimir was an Imperial Russian order established on  by Empress Catherine II in memory of the deeds of Saint Vladimir, the Grand Prince and the Baptizer of the Kievan Rus'.

Grades 
The order had four degrees and was awarded for continuous civil and military service. People who had been awarded with the St. Vladimir Order for military merits bore it with a special fold on the ribbon – "with a bow". There was a certain hierarchy of Russian Orders. According to this, the First Class Order of Saint Vladimir was the second one—the first was the Saint George Order—by its significance.

According to Russian laws on nobility, people who were awarded the Order of Saint Vladimir had the rights of hereditary nobility until the Emperor's decree of 1900 was issued. After this, only three first classes of the order gave such a right, the last one granting only personal nobility.

Today, Grand Duchess Maria Vladimirovna, pretender to the Russian Throne and claimant to the Headship of the Russian Imperial House, continues to award the Russian Imperial Order of Saint Vladimir as a dynastic order of knighthood. The validity of her awards is disputed by some historians and by some members of the Romanov Family Association.

Styles 

 First class A red cross with black and golden borders; the badge of the order depended from a sash worn over the right shoulder, and a gold-and-silver eight-rayed star was fastened over the left chest
 Second class The red cross on the neck and the star over the left chest
 Third class The red cross of a smaller size on the neck
 Fourth class The red cross over the left chest

Insignia 

A red enamelled cross pattée with black enamelled borders, and a black enamelled central disc bearing a crowned red and ermine mantle with the monogram of Saint Vladimir. Worn on a sash by the first degree, on a necklet by the second and third degrees, and on a chest ribbon by the fourth degree.

A four-pointed star superimposed upon a four-pointed gold star, with a golden cross pattée and the letters "CPKB" between the arms of the cross on a black enamel background at the centre surrounded by the motto of the order "Benefit, Honour and Glory".

Worn on the left chest by the first and second degrees. This motto was transferred to present-day star of the Order of Merit for the Fatherland, which was established in 1992 by President Boris Yeltsin and is today the second highest ranking decoration of that country.

Order of Saint Vladimir of the Russian Orthodox Church 
In 1957, in commemoration of the 40th anniversary of the Patriarch of Moscow's restoration in Russia, an Order of Saint Vladimir was created by the Russian Orthodox Church. The order is to be awarded to priests and nuns of the Orthodox church for their service to the Soviet Union and later Russia.

There are three degrees of the order. It has no relation to the imperial order.

Select recipients

 Abbasgulu Bakikhanov
 Alexander Kolchak
 Angus Buchanan
 Anto Gvozdenović
 August Ludwig von Schlözer
 Charles Broke Vere
 Charles Esmond de Wolff
 Dimitrije Milaković
 Fyodor Matisen
 Gavriil Alekseevich Korsak-Koulagenkov 
 Hugo W. Koehler
 Igor Sikorsky
 Ilya Ulyanov
 Ivan Gannibal
 Jacob van Deventer
 Jovan Sundečić
 Louis-Mathieu Langlès
 Mikhail Tukhachevsky
 Mitrofan Lodyzhensky
 Nikolai Yudenich
 Nićifor Dučić
 Pyotr Ilyich Tchaikovsky
 Paulos Gregorios
 Pyotr Stolypin
 Robert Henry Dick
 William Munro Kerr
 Hugh Henry Mitchell
 Petar Bojović
 Đorđe Petrović
 Karl Nesselrode
 Pyotr Poletika
 Asad-bey Talyshkhanov

References 

1782 establishments in the Russian Empire
Russian Orthodox Church
 
Saint Vladimir, Order of
Saint Vladimir, Order of
Orders of chivalry of Russia
Vladimir the Great